The Bandel–Katwa line is a  long railway line connecting Bandel in Hooghly district and Katwa in Purba Bardhaman district of West Bengal, India. It is a major route for North bound trains from Howrah and forms a part of the Kolkata Suburban Railway system.

History 
In 1913, the Hooghly–Katwa Railway constructed a line from Bandel to Katwa. This was further extended by the Barharwa-Azimganj-Katwa railway to Barharwa on the Sahibganj loop line. The Burdwan Katwa Railway was constructed by McLeod's Light Railways in 1915.

A project 22 km in length, Nabadwip Dham–Patuli DL Railway Line is under construction. 170 Crore has been sanctioned by the Government of India. The track was doubled in 2014–15.

Electrification 
This line was electrified in 1994–96 with 25 kV overhead line.

References 

5 ft 6 in gauge railways in India
Rail transport in West Bengal
Transport in Purba Bardhaman district